Vellakulam is a village located in the Tirunelveli District of South Tamil Nadu, India.
The village is located 20–25 km from Kovilpatti and Sankarankovil.

This village is primarily dependent on agriculture, farmers are the core of the village.
Vellakulam is a village Panchayat, its jurisdiction includes the following villages:
Vellakulam
Kasilingapuram
North Aivaypulipatti
South Aivaypalipatti

Chennai well renowned The billroth hospital's Founder Dr.V.JAGANATHAN's father born here.

And currently Mr.GPR (7339504381) is the only man supporting against corruption and helping other poor and all people's who needs help...

References

Villages in Tirunelveli district